Quatre Cocos is a village in the District of Flacq on the East of the island of Mauritius, the main island of the Republic of Mauritius. It is located at -20.2078 [latitude in decimal degrees], 57.7625 [longitude in decimal degrees] and at an average elevation/altitude of meters of 39 metres above sea level.

References

Populated places in Mauritius